Robert Robb (20 February 1882 – 23 October 1941) was a British athlete.  He competed at the 1908 Summer Olympics in London.

In the 400 metres, Robb lost his preliminary heat with a time of 52.5 seconds to winner Ned Merriam's 52.2 seconds.  Robb did not advance to the semifinals.

He competed for a Belfast-based athletic club and was runner-up at the Irish Championships in 1908.

References

Sources
 
 
 

1882 births
1941 deaths
Sportspeople from Belfast
Athletes (track and field) at the 1908 Summer Olympics
Olympic athletes of Great Britain
Irish male sprinters
British male sprinters